Majhli Didi  is a 1967 Bollywood film directed by Hrishikesh Mukherjee, based on the Bengali language story, Mejdidi (Middle Sister) by Sarat Chandra Chattopadhyay, which was earlier filmed in Bengali in 1950 as Mejdidi. Majhli Didi stars Meena Kumari and Dharmendra.

Though the film didn't perform well at the Indian box office, it remains one of Hrishikesh Mukherjee's highly rated films. At the 16th Filmfare Awards, it won Best Screenplay Awards for Nabendu Ghosh and Best Art Direction, B&W for Ajit Banerjee. It was India's entry to the 41st Academy Awards for Best Foreign Language Film.

Plot
Bipinchandra (Dharmendra) breaks family tradition by marrying a city girl, Hemangini (Meena Kumari), much to the chagrin of his sister-in-law, Kadambini (Lalita Pawar), and her husband, Navinchandra (Bipin Gupta). Things are delicate even after both women give birth to two children each. Then Hemangini testifies against Navinchandra in Court, leading to the division of the property. Things get worse by the arrival of Kadambini's orphaned school-going step-brother, Kishan (Sachin), who is beaten and abused not only by Kadambini and Navinchandra, but also by their overweight son. When Hemangini objects to Kishan's ill-treatment, Bipin takes the side of the rest of the family, and may probably force her to abandon Kishan to his fate or divorce her.

Cast
 Meena Kumari as Hemangini 'Hema'
 Dharmendra as Bipinchandra 'Bipin'
 Sachin as Kishan
 Lalita Pawar as Kadambini
 Bipin Gupta as Navinchandra 'Navin'
 Leela Chitnis as Kishan's Mother
 Leela Mishra  as Kishan's neighbor
 Asit Sen as Babunath, prosecuting lawyer
 Maruti
 Keshto Mukherjee as Bhola, Navin's employee
 Sarika as Uma, Hemangini's daughter
 Jalal Agha as Kamal

Music
"Ma Hi Ganga Ma Hi Jamuna Ma Hi Teerth Dhaam" - Lata Mangeshkar
"Ma Hi Ganga Ma Hi Jamuna Ma Hi Teerth Dhaam v2" - Lata Mangeshkar, Kamal Barot
"Ma Hi Ganga Ma Hi Jamuna Ma Hi Teerth Dhaam v3" - Lata Mangeshkar
"Main Laal Laal Guchkoon" - Lata Mangeshkar, Kamal Barot and Neelima Chatterjee
"Nadiyon Ki Bhari Bhari God Jahaan" - Hemant Kumar
"Umariya Bin Khewat Ki Naiya" - Hemant Kumar

See also
 List of submissions to the 41st Academy Awards for Best Foreign Language Film
 List of Indian submissions for the Academy Award for Best Foreign Language Film

References

External links
 
 Majhli Didi at Bollywood Hungama
 Majhli Didi at Rotten Tomatoes
 Majhhli Didi by Sharath Chandra Bhathopadya from Pocket fM

1967 films
1960s Hindi-language films
Hindi remakes of Bengali films
Films based on Indian novels
Films based on works by Sarat Chandra Chattopadhyay
Indian black-and-white films
Films directed by Hrishikesh Mukherjee
Films scored by Hemant Kumar